The Southwestern Moundbuilders football team represents Southwestern College in college football.

Conference affiliations

History
The team began in 1903 with 9 wins, 5 losses, and 1 tie under coach J. J. Thiel.  Since then the Builders have posted three undefeated seasons:  1913, 1918, and 1967. There has never been a season of Southwestern College Football without at least one victory.

Coaches

See also List of Southwestern College Moundbuilders head football coaches

The current head football coach is Brad Griffin, who took over the program in 2015. Griffin was the defensive coordinator for eleven seasons with William Penn University prior to his arrival to Southwestern College. Other coaches during the program's history include Art Kahler, Harold Elliott, and Dennis Franchione.

Conference championships
Southwestern football teams have won the Kansas Collegiate Athletic Conference eleven times since 1929:  1964, 1967, 1968, 1982, 1983, 1985, 1987, 1997, 1998, 1999, and 2021.  They also were declared the Kansas State Champions in 1913.

Post-season and bowl games
Southwestern has participated in 4 bowl games with an overall record of 2 wins and 2 losses. The team has also advanced to the NAIA Football National Championship five times, with a record of 2 wins and 5 losses. The Moundbuilder's total post-season record is 4 wins and 7 losses in 11 post-season games.

In 1982, head coach Dennis Franchione led the Moundbuilders to 9 wins and 2 losses, with a conference championship and a win in the Sunflower Bowl. Charlie Cowdrey followed up the next year with an appearance in the Sunflower bowl, and then again in 1985.

1984 was the first year that Southwestern qualified for the NAIA Football National Championship. The first round the team defeated conference rival Bethel 17–14, but then lost to Northwestern College by a score of 45-23.

1996 saw Southwestern post its second bowl victory in the Wheat Bowl, defeating Baker University 28-20 under head coach Monty Lewis.

After the 1997 regular season, the team played in the National Championship, losing 53–28 to Doane College.

It was in 1998 when Southwestern saw some post-season success once again and advanced to the quarterfinals of the NAIA Football National Championship. The Moundbuilders defeated the Lindenwood Lions 12–10 in the first round and then lost 52–6 to Si Tanka (SD).

For the 1999 NAIA Football National Championship, the team lost in the first round to Northwestern Oklahoma State by a score of 44–10.

References